Milner is an English and Scottish occupational surname for a miller, and is related to the surname Miller.   Notable people with the surname include:

In arts and entertainment 
Andrew Milner (born 1950), British-Australian cultural theorist and literary critic
Edward Milner (1819–1884), English landscape architect
John Milner (magician) (born 1948), British magician, stage and TV performer
Martin Milner (1931–2015), American actor
Martin Milner (violinist) (1928–2000), British violinist
Paddy Milner (born 1980), British singer/songwriter

In business 
H. R. Milner (1889–1975), Canadian lawyer and businessman
John T. Milner (1826–1898), American engineer and businessman
Yuri Milner (born 1961), Israeli-Russian entrepreneur

In government, politics and activism 
Alfred Milner, 1st Viscount Milner (1854–1925), British colonial administrator
James Milner, 1st Baron Milner of Leeds (1889–1967), British politician
Marcus Milner (cricketer) (1864–1939), English racehorse trainer, soldier, civil servant and cricketer
Yeshimabeit Milner, American technologist and African American activist.

In religion 
Eric Milner-White (1884–1963), English cleric
Isaac Milner (1750–1820), English don, clergyman and mathematician
John Milner (bishop) (1752–1826), English Roman Catholic bishop and writer
John Milner (nonjuror) (1628–1702), English clergyman.

In science and academia 
Allison Milner (1983–2019), Australian disability, mental health and suicide researcher
Andrew Milner (born 1950), British-Australian cultural theorist and literary critic
Brenda Milner (born 1918), English-Canadian neuropsychologist
Eric Charles Milner (1928–1997), English mathematician and set theorist
Helen Milner (born 1958), American political scientist
James Milner (art historian) (1874–1927), British art executive
Jean-Claude Milner (born 1941), French philosopher and linguist
Marion Milner (1900–1998), British psychoanalyst and journal writer
Peter Milner (1919–2018), British-Canadian neuroscientist 
Robin Milner (1934–2010), British computer scientist
Stephen Milner, British scholar of Italian

In sport 
Alf Milner (1919–2002), English footballer
Andy Milner (born 1967), English footballer
Colin Milner Smith (1936–2020), English cricketer
Hoby Milner (born 1991), American baseball player
James Milner (born 1986), English footballer
Jim Milner (born 1933 as James Edward Milner), English footballer
John Milner (1949–2000), American baseball player
John Milner (footballer) (born 1942), English footballer
Marcus Milner (cricketer) (1864–1939), English racehorse trainer, soldier, civil servant and cricketer
Martrez Milner (born 1984), American football player
Tom Milner, several people

In other fields 
Frank Milner (1875–1944), New Zealand secondary school head-master
James Milner, 9th Seigneur of Sark (died 1730), British nobleman

Fictional characters
John Milner, a character in the 1973 film American Graffiti
Tommy Milner, a character in the 2019 film Scary Stories to Tell in the Dark

See also
Milnor

English-language surnames
Occupational surnames
English-language occupational surnames